Highway 64 (MT 64) is a  state highway in Madison and Gallatin counties in Montana,  United States. that connects the Mountain Village area of Big Sky Resort to an intersection with U.S. Route 191 (US 191) in Gallatin Canyon, about  south of Bozeman.

The road was constructed in the 1970s as part of the development of the Big Sky resort complex.

Route description

Major intersections

See also

 list of state highways in Montana

References

External links

064